Wareing is a surname. Notable people with the surname include:

Alan Wareing (born 1943), British television director
Bob Wareing (1930–2015), British politician
Guy Wareing (1899–1918), British flying ace
Herbert Wareing (1857–1918), British organist and composer
Kierston Wareing (born 1978), British actress
Lesley Wareing (1913–1988), British actress
Marcus Wareing (born 1970), British celebrity chef
William Wareing (1791–1865), British Roman Catholic bishop

See also
Waering (surname)
Waring (surname)